The following television stations in the United States brand as channel 2 (though neither using virtual channel 2 nor broadcasting on physical RF channel 2):
 KALB-DT2 in Alexandria, Louisiana
 KDLH in Duluth, Minnesota
 KMBH-LD in McAllen, Texas
 KPSP-CD in Cathedral City, California
 KYUU-LD in Boise, Idaho
 WBBH-TV in Fort Myers, Florida
 WENY-DT3 in Elmira, New York
 WTOK-DT2 in Meridian, Mississippi

The following television stations in the United States formerly branded as channel 2:
 KDLH-DT2 in Duluth, Minnesota
 KRII-DT2 in Chisholm, Minnesota

02 branded